Muḥammad Sāliḥ al-Māzandarānī (d. 1086 AH), He is Shia Islamic scholar and jurist, He is the author of a ten-volume commentary, Sharḥ Uṣūl al-Kāfī, on the first of the Four Books (hadiths) of Shi'a Islam (al-Kafi, written by Kulayni, d. 329 AH).

Early life and education 
He lived in city of Isfahan, He received a religious education from Mulla Mohammad Taqi Majlesi (The First Majlesi, 1594 AD-1660 AD) father of Mohammad-Baqer Majlesi, He married scholar Amena Begum (daughter of Mohammad Taqi Majlesi), He also was student of Mulla Hassan Ali bin Abdullah Al-Tusturi and his Father Mulla Abdullah Al-Tusturi and Sheikh Baha'i, He gained a high position in religious science and jurisprudence, and he was one of the famous scholars, And praised by many scholars such as Ardebili in ''Jami' al-Ruwah'', Al-Hurr al-Amili in ''Amal al-āmil''.

Works 

 Sharḥ Uṣūl al-Kāfī and Rawdah al-Kafi (Explanation of “Usul al-Kafi” and Rawdah al-Kafi by Al-Kulayni), and his son sheikh Muhammad-Hadi completed his father's work in Explanation of “Kitab al-Kafi” by writing explanation of ''Furu' al-Kafi''
 Explanation of “Man La Yahduruhu al-Faqih” by Saduq
 Explanation of “Ma'alem al-Usul” in Principles of jurisprudence by Al-Hassan Bin Al-Shahid II
 Explanation of “Zubdat al-Usul” in Principles of jurisprudence by Baha' al-din al-'Amili
 Commentary of ''Ar-Rawda-l-Bahiyah fi Sharh allam'a-d-Dimashqiya'' in jurisprudence by Al-Shahid II
 Explanation of ''Al-Daridia poem''

Died 
He died , Buried next to Mulla Mohammad Taqi Majlesi in Isfahan, Iran.

See also
Kitab al-Kafi
List of hadith authors and commentators
Sources of sharia

References

External links 

 al-shia.org/الشيخ محمد صالح المازندراني (in Arabic)
al-shia.org/ملاّ محمد صالح، معروف به ملّاصالح مازندرانی (in Persian)
 almerja.com/محمد صالح بن أحمد المازندراني (in Arabic)

11th-century Muslim scholars of Islam
Hadith scholars
Iranian scholars
Iranian Shia scholars of Islam
1675 deaths